Line X was a section of the KGB First Chief Directorate residency organization assigned to acquire Western technology for the Directorate of Scientific and Technical Intelligence (Directorate "T"). In the early 1980s, over 200 Line X agents were exposed or compromised as a consequence of the Farewell Dossier, collapsing the Line X operations in Europe.

References

KGB
Science and technology in the Soviet Union